Galu Kuh (also Romanized as Galū Kūh) is a village in Shanderman Rural District, Shanderman District, Masal County, Gilan Province, Iran. At the 2006 census, its population was 15, in 4 families.

References 

Populated places in Masal County